David Lee Pinkney is a British businessman and auto racing driver. He competed in the British Touring Car Championship on and off between 1989 and 2011.

Racing career

James Weaver talked David into racing and he started out in the Uniroyal Saloon Car Championship in 1987 with a £5000 Rover Vitess SD1 racing against the new Sierra Cosworths- in 1988 he raced a Cosworth Sierra in the production saloon championship- then moved on to the BTCC in 1989 with a troubled RS500 prepared by Terry Drury, then three more years in a Cosworth Saphire - Moving back to the BTCC in a Prodrive BMW in 1993. He also briefly raced in the BTCC series with Tim Harvey in 2001 in a rather unreliable Alfa Romeo 147, leaving the JSM team after four rounds and four breakdowns.

He has won the VW Vento VR6 Championships in 1996 & 97 - The Vauxhall Vectra winter series and the Vauxhall Vectra SRi Championship in 1998 and 1999. He also raced on and off in the Porsche Carrera Cup in 2003, 2004 and once in 2005, and the Seat Cupra Championship in 2005.

In 2006 he raced in the British Touring Car Championship (BTCC) in one of the 2005 championship-winning Honda Integra cars. David was very competitive against the new 2006 cars - He took a pair of top 5 finishes at Thruxton in rounds 11 and 12, and also a podium in race three at Knockhill. For 2007 he drove an N.Technology built Alfa 156 run by the newly established A-Tech team, unfortunately the Alfa wouldn't work on dunlops.

After competing in two rounds of the British GT Championship in 2008, he returned to the BTCC in 2009, driving competitively for Team Dynamics in a Honda Civic TypeR with three different team-mates – Gordon Shedden at the first round, former F1 Formula One race-winner Johnny Herbert in three rounds, and double series champion James Thompson in the other rounds.

In 2010, Pinkney drove a BTCC Triple Eight Vauxhall Vectra with the new Swindon Turbo engine - He opened the season with his first ever triple top-ten finish, with eighth in race one and two tenth places. Was quickest at Brands throughout in 2nd meeting but was unfortunately power compromised for the rest of the season. Which ended his competitive racing career - 

In 2011, Pinkney entered the BTCC with Rob Austin Racing driving their new NGTC-spec Audi A4. Pinkney failed to make the start at the first meeting at Brands Hatch and subsequently left the team.

Luton Town Football Club
On 13 April 2007, David Pinkney bought Luton Town Football Club. The club tried to secure planning permission for a 50.000 seater stadium at Junction 12 on the M1. In 2008 Pinkney moved on following the decision of the FA to charge the football club in relation to a number of financial irregularities.

Racing record

Complete British Touring Car Championship results
(key) Races in bold indicate pole position (1 point awarded - 2001 all races, 2006–present just in first race) Races in italics indicate fastest lap (1 point awarded - 2001–present all races) * signifies that driver lead race for at least one lap (1 point given - 2001 just in feature race, 2006–present all races)

Complete Deutsche Tourenwagen Meisterschaft results
(key) (Races in bold indicate pole position) (Races in italics indicate fastest lap)

† Not classified in championship due to only entering in the non-championship event.

Complete Porsche Supercup results
(key) (Races in bold indicate pole position) (Races in italics indicate fastest lap)

‡ – Guest driver – Not eligible for points.

References

British Touring Car Championship drivers
Living people
People from Bridlington
Luton Town F.C.
British GT Championship drivers
Porsche Supercup drivers
1962 births
Porsche Carrera Cup GB drivers